The Hong Kong Alliance of Chinese and Expatriates was a small political party in Hong Kong set up in 1994.

The party aimed at upholding the Hong Kong residents holding foreign passports. It took a conservative and pro-Beijing stance as its Chairman Guy Lam Kwok-hung, who was a Canadian citizen, said Hong Kong should not be hostile towards Beijing as it was reverting to Mainland China. Lam also said it was fortunate the Tiananmen Square protests occurred before the huge changes in Eastern Europe as Hong Kong needs a stable China.

Guy Lam campaigned for a seat in the Legislative Council in the 1995 elections, but lost to Democratic Party's Huang Chen-ya in Island West constituency.

The party ceased to exist in 2007.

Election performances

Legislative council elections

References

1994 establishments in Hong Kong
2007 disestablishments in Hong Kong
Defunct political parties in Hong Kong
Political parties disestablished in 2007
Political parties established in 1994